The Kuala Lumpur Stadium or KLFA Stadium is a multi-purpose stadium in Kuala Lumpur, Malaysia. It is currently used mostly for football matches and is the home stadium of Kuala Lumpur City.

Background
In the past, the stadium was used as the home ground of many Malaysian teams, including Felda United, PDRM, PLUS, Selangor and UKM FC. The stadium has been closed in July 2011 due to the City Hall's reluctance to renovate the pitch. Starting in 2012, the stadium has also been used for rugby matches. It was used for the first match of the 2013 Media Prima 6 Regions, between Kelab Rakan Muda Malaysia and Singapore Cricket Club. Between 2013 and 2018, the stadium was renovated; after the renovation, the stadium has a capacity for 18,000 spectators.

International football matches

Transport
The stadium is accessed by Rapid KL bus T402 to Taman Midah MRT Station on the Kajang Line, and T400 to Sri Kota flats just outside Bandar Tun Razak LRT station on the Sri Petaling Line or via Cochrane MRT station.

References

External links 
 Kuala Lumpur Stadium at worldstadiums.com

Football venues in Malaysia
Athletics (track and field) venues in Malaysia
Rugby union stadiums in Malaysia
Kuala Lumpur City F.C.
Multi-purpose stadiums in Malaysia
Sports venues in Kuala Lumpur
Southeast Asian Games football venues